Bonnay may refer to:

Surname
Michel de Bonnay
Yvette Bonnay

Places
Bonnay, Doubs, France
Bonnay, Saône-et-Loire, France
Bonnay, Somme, France